Rhus aromatica, the fragrant sumac, is a deciduous shrub in the family Anacardiaceae native to North America. It is found in southern Canada (Alberta to Quebec) and nearly all of the lower 48 states except peninsular Florida. 

The plant develops yellow flowers in clusters on short lateral shoots in March through May. The flower is a small, dense inflorescence that usually opens before the plant's leaves do.  

The species is polygamodioecious (mostly dioecious, primarily bearing flowers of only one sex, but with either a few flowers of the opposite sex or a few bisexual flowers on the same plant). Male (staminate) flowers develop in yellowish catkins, while female (pistillate) flowers develop in short bright yellow panicles at the ends of branches. 

The fruits become an important winter food for birds and small mammals that can remain on the plant until spring if not eaten.

The plant's alternate compound leaves have three leaflets that vary in shape, lobing, and margination. The unstalked leaflets are ovate to rhomboid, more or less wedge-shaped at the base, coarsely-toothed and usually shiny glabrous above.

Fragrant sumac's three-leafleted lobed leaves resemble those of its relative, poison ivy (Toxicodendron radicans). However, poison ivy's central leaflet has a stem, whereas fragrant sumac's does not.

The plant's  green to glossy blue-green summer foliage becomes orange to red or purple in the fall. Stems are thin and brownish-gray, with rust-colored lenticels when young. Leaves and stems emit a lemon scent when crushed. There are no terminal buds, but overwintering male catkins are present.

Fragrant sumac is common along the forested eastern margins of the Great Plains and in open or otherwise disturbed sites on the margins of the Gulf Coast prairie. It grows at a range of sites including open rocky woodlands, valley bottoms, lower rocky slopes, and roadsides. It is not widely used for landscape plantings but is often used as a ground cover, especially on banks. The plant's colorful fall foliage is its main ornamental feature. 

The plant grows in full deep shade to full sun and well-drained soils slightly acid to well alkaline with a pH range of about 6.0 to 8.5. It has a shallow, fibrous root system and is easily transplanted. Some of its branches can trail upon the ground and develop roots.  The plant can ground sucker to form a colony.

Conservation status in the United States
It is listed as of special concern and believed extirpated in Connecticut. However, this status applies only to native populations.  In Washington, Connecticut, and New Hampshire it is considered introduced.

References

External links 

 http://www.missouribotanicalgarden.org/PlantFinder/PlantFinderDetails.aspx?kempercode=f180

aromatica